The Eye of Heaven is a Fargo adventure novel. The two main characters of the Fargo novels are adventurers Sam Fargo and his wife, Remi. The Eye of Heaven is the sixth book of the Fargo series. The book's hardcover edition was first published September 2, 2014.

Plot
Baffin Island: Husband-and-wife team Sam and Remi Fargo are on a climate-control expedition in the Arctic, when to their astonishment they discover a Viking ship in the ice, perfectly preserved—and filled with pre–Columbian artifacts from Mexico.

How can that be? As they plunge into their research, tantalizing clues about a link between the Vikings and the legendary Toltec feathered serpent god Quetzalcoatl/Ce Acatl Topiltzin —and a fabled object known as the Eye of Heaven— begin to emerge. But so do many dangerous people. Soon the Fargos find themselves on the run through jungles, temples, and secret tombs, caught between treasure hunters, crime cartels, and those with a far more personal motivation for stopping them. At the end of the road will be the solution to a thousand-year-old mystery—or death.

References

2014 American novels
Novels by Clive Cussler
Fargo Adventures
Collaborative novels
G. P. Putnam's Sons books
Michael Joseph books